Dunbrooke is an unincorporated community in Essex County, in the U.S. state of Virginia. It was named for the postmasters in the 1800s Robert Dunn and Sarah Elizabeth Brooks. The community's former name was Piscataway. 

Cherry Walk was listed on the National Register of Historic Places in 1983.

References

Unincorporated communities in Virginia
Unincorporated communities in Essex County, Virginia